SilverStone Technology Co., Ltd is a company based in Taiwan that makes computer cases, power supplies, and other peripherals for personal computers. The company SilverStone Technology Co., Ltd was founded in 2003 by former Cooler Master employees.

SilverStone's cases compete in the enthusiast market with other computer case manufacturers including Antec, Cooler Master, Thermaltake, Lian Li and Zalman.

Silverstone's product range includes power supplies, cooling fans, and CPU heat sinks.

Enclosures
SilverStone produces a range of computer cases for different uses. Each of the case types is usually under a particular model name.

See also
 List of companies of Taiwan
Antec
Cooler Master
Corsair
FSP Group
Lian Li
Thermaltake
Zalman

References

External links 
Official English website
A review containing several Small Form Factor components from SilverStone

2003 establishments in Taiwan
Computer enclosure companies
Computer hardware cooling
Computer power supply unit manufacturers
Manufacturing companies based in New Taipei
Electronics companies of Taiwan
Taiwanese brands